The 2010–13 Sun Belt Conference realignment refers to the Sun Belt Conference dealing with several proposed and actual conference expansion and reduction plans among various NCAA conferences and institutions from 2010 to 2013.

Background 

The Sun Belt Conference had seen little effect from the first several rounds of realignment, with the only change being the loss of non-football member Denver to the WAC. Although South Alabama had announced it would establish an FBS football program and join the Sun Belt football league in 2012, this move was finalized before the Big Ten and Pac-10 set the realignment process into motion.

However, reports emerged in March 2012 that the conference considered Charlotte and UTSA "leading candidates" for expansion, and had entered into talks with both schools. One source indicated that both had received informal invitations. In another significant move, the Sun Belt replaced its commissioner Wright Waters, who retired on March 15, with WAC commissioner Karl Benson.

The Sun Belt's first official move, however, involved neither Charlotte nor UTSA. Instead, CBSSports.com reported on April 3 that conference presidents had voted to extend an invitation to Georgia State University, then a member of the Colonial Athletic Association, effective in 2013. Four days later, it was reported that Georgia State had accepted the invitation, and that the move would officially be announced on April 9. As a part of this move, the school will move its football program from FCS to FBS, play a full conference schedule in 2013, and become a full FBS member in 2014.

The timing of Georgia State's move was no coincidence. The CAA was set to vote on April 10 to increase its exit fee from $250,000 to at least $1 million. Also, the NCAA has a deadline of June 1 for Division I FCS schools to announce the start of a transition to FBS.

On May 2, the Sun Belt and Texas State announced that the Bobcats would leave the WAC after only one season and join the Sun Belt in 2013. Benson implied that the Sun Belt's invitation to Texas State was in part driven by the then-rumored departure of North Texas to Conference USA: "It was important that we remain in the state of Texas, and Texas State certainly does that, regardless of what happens with the University of North Texas."

At that time, it was reported by Sun Belt commissioner Karl Benson that it would be his goal to expand the SBC to 12 teams in order to sponsor a conference championship game.

The Sun Belt then announced on May 23 that UT Arlington, at the time a non-football school in the Southland Conference that was set to join the WAC that July, had accepted an invitation to join the Sun Belt in 2013. The move became official the following day, after approval by the University of Texas Board of Regents. Also on May 23, Benson categorically stated that the Sun Belt would not expand beyond 10 football members—a move that could have forced Idaho and New Mexico State, the only two football programs remaining in the WAC beyond 2012, to drop to FCS football.

On November 28, 2012, Conference USA added current Sun Belt members Middle Tennessee State and Florida Atlantic, later announcing the two would join that conference in 2013.

On March 27, 2013, the Sun Belt announced the addition of four more members, two in all sports and two for football only, in 2014. Appalachian State and Georgia Southern will begin FBS transitions in 2013, join the Sun Belt in 2014, and become full FBS members in 2015. After the WAC dropped football, Idaho, a former football-only Sun Belt member, and New Mexico State, formerly an all-sports member, will both return for football after one season as FBS independents.

On September 1, 2015, the Sun Belt announced the addition of Coastal Carolina as a full member effective 2016 for all sports except football. For football, Coastal Carolina will begin its FBS transition in 2016, join the conference in 2017, and become bowl-eligible in 2018.

On March 1, 2016, the Sun Belt announced that it would not renew the associate memberships of Idaho and New Mexico State for football after the 2017 FBS season.

Membership changes

See also
 NCAA conference realignment
 2005 NCAA conference realignment
 1996 NCAA conference realignment

References

External links
 CollegeSportsInfo.com Conference realignment news and updates

Sun Belt
Sun Belt Conference